William McCabe may refer to:
 William McCabe (footballer), Irish footballer
 William Bernard McCabe, Irish author of historical romances
 William U. McCabe, attorney and politician from Arkansas
 William Putnam McCabe, emissary and organiser in Ireland for the Society of United Irishmen

See also
 Bill McCabe (disambiguation)